The Willimantic Elks Club is a historic Elks lodge at 198 Pleasant Street in the Willimantic section of Windham, Connecticut.  Built in 1925 for a lodge founded in 1914, it is one of the finest examples of Tudor Revival architecture in the region, and has been a major site of social events in the community since.  The building was added to the National Register of Historic Places in 2005.

Description and history
The Willimantic Elks Club is located in a residential area across the Willimantic River from downtown Willimantic, set on the south side of Pleasant Street between John Street and Lebanon Avenue  It is a large 2-1/2 story building, with steel frame construction and a half-timber and stucco appearance characteristic of the Tudor Revival.  The ground floor is finished in fieldstone, and the building corners are finished in brick quoining.  A large addition lacks architectural notice, but is sited to minimize intrusion on the appearance of the original building.  The interior of the building houses social and meeting spaces, built to dimensions specified by the national Elks organization at the time of its construction.

Willimantic's Elks lodge was established in 1914, and quickly became a major civic and business social center in the community.  Its membership included a cross-section of the community's business leadership and was ethnically diverse, although only white men were originally allowed as members.  The hall was built in 1925 and enlarged in 1957 to serve Elks functions.  It is the area's finest example of Tudor Revival architecture.

See also
National Register of Historic Places listings in Windham County, Connecticut

References

External links
Connectict Elks - Willimantic Lodge

Clubhouses on the National Register of Historic Places in Connecticut
Buildings and structures completed in 1925
Clubhouses in Connecticut
Buildings and structures in Windham County, Connecticut
Elks buildings
Willimantic, Connecticut
National Register of Historic Places in Windham County, Connecticut